Declan Darcy (Irish: Déaglán Ó Dorchaí) is a former Gaelic footballer who played for the Leitrim and Dublin county teams. He captained Leitrim to the 1994 Connacht Senior Football Championship, he also won a Connacht Under-21 Football Championship in 1991. He won Leitrim Senior Football Championship titles in 1989, 1992, 1993, 1994 with Aughawillian and also played with St. Brigids GAA Club in Dublin. He won a Dublin Senior Club Championship and Leinster Senior Club Championship with St. Brigids in 2003.  

He served as a selector of the Dublin under-21 football team for the 2009 championship season. Darcy also helped manage St Brigid's minor team, alongside Gerry McEntee, Liam Plunkett and Mick Clerkin, to Minor 'A' Championship glory in 2008, winning both Dublin and Leinster titles. He worked alongside Shane O'Hanlon and Jim Brogan. 

He was a selector with Jim Gavin, who guided Dublin to the 2013 All-Ireland Senior Football Championship Final after defeating Kerry in the semi-final by 3–18 to 3–11.
Dublin went on to win the final on 22 September, defeating Mayo by 2–12 to 1–14. He now manages a youth in team in Clanna Gael Fontenoy.

Honours
 Connacht Senior Football Championship: 1994
 Connacht Under-21 Football Championship: 1991
 All-Ireland Senior B Championship: 1990, 1991, 1992
 Leitrim Senior Football Championship: 1989, 1992, 1993, 1994
 1 Leitrim Under-21 Football Championship
 1 Leitrim Senior Football League 
 3 All Star nominations
 Leinster Senior Football Championship 2002
 Leinster Senior Club Football Championship 2003
 1 Dublin Senior Football Championship 
 2 Dublin Senior League 
 Irish Press Sports Star of the Year 1994
 Selector with Dublin 2013 All-Ireland Champions.

References

Year of birth missing (living people)
Living people
Aughawillian Gaelic footballers
Dublin inter-county Gaelic footballers
Gaelic football backs
Gaelic football selectors
Leitrim inter-county Gaelic footballers
St Brigid's (Dublin) Gaelic footballers
Sportspeople from County Leitrim